Sergej Kraigher (30 May 1914 – 17 January 2001) was a Yugoslav communist politician from Slovenia who served as the President of the Presidency of Yugoslavia from 1981 to 1982. During World War II, he fought in the Yugoslav Resistance Movement.

Biography
Kraigher was born in Postojna, Austria-Hungary, modern-day Slovenia. His uncle, Jurij Kraigher was a prominent American civil and war pilot. His other uncle, Alojz Kraigher, was a prominent writer and left wing activist, while his cousin Boris also became an influential communist politician.

Kraigher rose through the ranks of the Communist Party of Slovenia in the 1940s. He fought in the Partisan resistance. Kraigher became chairman of the People's Assembly of Slovenia in 1967 and held that position until 1974, after which he served as President of the Presidency of Slovenia from 1974 until 1979. Following the death of Edvard Kardelj, Kraigher became the Slovenian member of the collective Presidency of Yugoslavia and served as its 3rd President after the death of Josip Broz Tito in 1980, from 1981 to 1982. 

He is also known for being the chairman of the Kraigher Commission, which was set up by the Yugoslav government to advise and give proposals in solving the Yugoslav economic crisis which started to develop in the early to mid-1980s. The commission report was the basis of a reform package that was to be implemented by the Milka Planinc cabinet, but it never happened.

Kraigher died in Ljubljana, Slovenia on 17 January 2001, at the age of 86.

References

External links

1914 births
2001 deaths
People from Postojna
Governors of the National Bank of Yugoslavia
Slovenian atheists
League of Communists of Slovenia politicians
Central Committee of the League of Communists of Yugoslavia members
Recipients of the Order of the Hero of Socialist Labour